Nationality words link to articles with information on the nation's poetry or literature (for instance, Irish or France).

Events

905:
 Presentation of the Kokin Wakashū (approx.).

Works published

Births
Death years link to the corresponding "[year] in poetry" article. There are conflicting or unreliable sources for the birth years of many people born in this period; where sources conflict, the poet is listed again and the conflict is noted:

902:
 Adikavi Pampa (died 975), writing in the Kannada language

908:
 Kiyohara no Motosuke (died 990), one of the Thirty-six Poetry Immortals of Japan

Deaths
Birth years link to the corresponding "[year] in poetry" article:

900:
 Ono no Komachi (born 825), an early woman poet and one of the Six best Waka poets

903:
 March 26: Sugawara no Michizane (born 845), Japanese kanshi poet

904:
 Ki no Tomonori (born 850), Heian waka poet of the court, a member of the sanjūrokkasen or Thirty-six Poetry Immortals

908:
 Abdullah ibn al-Mu'tazz (born 861), Arabic poet

909:
 Luo Yin (born 833), Chinese poet

See also

 Poetry
 10th century in poetry
 10th century in literature
 List of years in poetry

Other events:
 Other events of the 12th century
 Other events of the 13th century

10th century:
 10th century in poetry
 10th century in literature

Notes

10th-century poetry
Poetry